Vincent ("Vince") John O'Sullivan (born February 23, 1957 in London, Greater London) is a retired male racewalker from the United States, who competed at the 1984 Summer Olympics for Team USA. He was fifth at the 1979 Pan American Games and also took part in the IAAF World Race Walking Cup.

Achievements

External links

1957 births
Living people
American male racewalkers
Athletes (track and field) at the 1979 Pan American Games
Athletes (track and field) at the 1984 Summer Olympics
Olympic track and field athletes of the United States
Athletes from London
Pan American Games track and field athletes for the United States